The 2012 Espirito Santo Trophy took place 27–30 September at the Gloria Golf Club, on its New Course and Old Course in Antalya, Turkey.

It was the 25th women's golf World Amateur Team Championship for the Espirito Santo Trophy.

The tournament was a 72-hole stroke play team event. There were a record 53 team entries, each with two or three players.

Each team played two rounds at the New Course and two rounds at the Old Course. The leading teams played the fourth round at the Old Course. The best two scores for each round counted towards the team total.

Team South Korea successfully defended their title from two years ago, winning the Trophy for the third time, with a 13-under-par score of 563, three strokes ahead of silver medalist team Germany. The bronze medal was shared between former champions team Australia and, for the first time on the podium, team Finland, on tied third place one more stroke back.

The individual title went to 15-year-old Lydia Ko, New Zealand, whose score of 14-under-par 274 was a championship record and six strokes ahead of two players who shared second place.

Teams 
53 teams entered the event and completed the competition. Each team had three players, except team Bosnia and Herzegovina and team Serbia, which only had two.

Results 

Source:

Individual leaders 
There was no official recognition for the lowest individual scores.

References

External links 
World Amateur Team Championships on International Golf Federation website

Espirito Santo Trophy
Golf tournaments in Turkey
Espirito Santo Trophy
Espirito Santo Trophy
Espirito Santo Trophy